George Pickering may refer to:
 George Pickering (1758–1826), English poet and songwriter
 George Pickering (cricketer) (1832–1858), Australian cricketer
 George Pickering (politician) (died 1876), Australian politician
 George Pickering (physician) (1904–1980), British medical doctor and academic